Gabriela Lastra-Yetten (born June 7, 1980) is a former professional tennis player from the United States.

Biography
Lastra, who was born in Chile, played junior tennis in Northern California, before attending Stanford University.

While at Stanford she competed in the local WTA Tour tournament, the Stanford Classic, on multiple occasions in the women's doubles draw. She and Keiko Tokuda paired together to reach the quarter-finals in 2000. A member of three NCAA Division 1 Championship winning teams, she partnered with Lauren Kalvaria win the NCAA doubles title in 2002. The pair also competed at the 2002 US Open as wildcards and were beaten in the first round by 15th seeds Kim Clijsters and Meghann Shaughnessy.

In 2003 she was a doubles quarter-finalist at the Warsaw Open and qualified for the doubles main draw in Madrid. At the 2003 US Open, she won her way through qualifying, with wins over Kristen Schlukebir, Sandra Kleinova and Nuria Llagostera Vives. She lost to Amanda Coetzer in the first round, but by qualifying had entered the world's top 200.

Following her 2003 US Open appearance she retired from professional tennis and worked for several years for a private equity firm in New York. She has since moved to Andover, Massachusetts and is known by her married name Yetten. Locally she is involved in coaching tennis and has served on the coaching staff at Bentley University.

References

External links
 
 

1980 births
Living people
American female tennis players
Stanford Cardinal women's tennis players
Chilean emigrants to the United States
Tennis people from California